The second season of The Voice Kids was a Philippine reality singing competition on ABS-CBN. Lea Salonga, Bamboo Mañalac and Sarah Geronimo returned to the show as coaches. Luis Manzano also returned as host, accompanied by Robi Domingo and Yeng Constantino as the show's backstage and media hosts.

The show premiered on June 6, 2015.

The show ended on August 30, 2015 with Elha Mae Nympha of Kamp Kawayan being declared as the winner, marking Bamboo Manalac's first win as a coach.

Developments
After the finale of the first season of The Voice of the Philippines, it was announced that The Voice Kids will have a second season. This was also confirmed by Salonga.

In an article authored by Aster Amoyo and was published by Pilipino Star Ngayon, it was stated in her article that the show will end on August 30 of this year—though there wasn't any definite premiere date for the show. In May 2015, the show was revealed to air on June 6, 2015, replacing the timeslot of the first season of Your Face Sounds Familiar.

Coaches and hosts

Lea Salonga confirmed on Twitter and in Aquino & Abunda Tonight that she will be returning for the second season; Bamboo Mañalac and Sarah Geronimo were also confirmed to return to the show. Luis Manzano also returned as host. Alex Gonzaga did not return as host and instead was replaced by Robi Domingo and Yeng Constantino.

Auditions

The ages of the auditionees were reduced to 7–13 years old; in the previous season, it was 8–14 years old. The auditions were announced after the finale of the second season of The Voice of the Philippines:

Teams
 Color key

Blind auditions
The filming for the Blind auditions started on April 25, 2015.

It aired from June 6 to July 19 for 14 episodes with a total of 79 aspiring contestants.

Color key

Episode 1 (June 6)
The first episode was graced by an opening number from the coaches wherein they sang "Start of Something New" from the High School Musical and "ABC" from the Jackson 5.

Episode 2 (June 7)

Episode 3 (June 13)

Episode 4 (June 14)

Episode 5 (June 20)

Episode 6 (June 21)

Episode 7 (June 27)

Episode 8 (June 28)

Note

  Emman & Sandy Tanio sang the Visayan version of "Just Give Me a Reason."

Episode 9 (July 4)

Episode 10 (July 5)

Episode 11 (July 11)

Episode 12 (July 12)

Episode 13 (July 18)

Episode 14 (July 19)

The Battles

54 artists advanced to the Battles. This part of the competition follows the format of the previous season wherein three artists pit for one of the six spots per team in the Sing-offs. The Battles first aired on July 25, 2015.

On its first episode, Yeng Constantino along with The Voice of the Philippines winners' Mitoy Yonting and Jason Dy, and The Voice Kids first season winner Lyca Gairanod sang "Puso" by Sponge Cola and "Liwanag sa Dilim" by Rivermaya.

Color key

The Sing-offs
18 artists advanced to the Sing-offs. This part of the competition follows the format of the previous season wherein six artists performed for their coach's two spots for the Live shows. The Sing-offs first aired on August 9, 2015.

Color key

Live shows

Results summary
Color key
Artist's info

Result details

Live show details
The Live shows were held in Newport Performing Arts Theater, Resorts World Manila, Newport City, Pasay from August 22, 2015 to August 29, 2015.

This season followed the format from the previous season wherein the outcome of the Live shows will solely be from the results of the public's votes. Voting lines were opened every Saturdays after all the performances of the artists, and ended on Sundays. In the semifinals, the top four artists coming from the results of the public votes advanced to the Finals. The public was only allowed to vote once per mobile number per weekend night.

Color key

Week 1: Semifinals (August 22 & 23)
With the elimination of Kyle Echarri and Zephanie Dimaranan, Sarah Geronimo no longer has any artists remaining on her team, which for the first time in the show's history, a coach's team doesn't have any artists left for the finale.

Week 2: The Finale (August 29 & 30)
Color key

Post-season concert special
Boses ng Bulilit, Muling Bibirit was a post-season concert special aired on September 5 and 6, 2015.

Notable Artists 
 Krystle Campos and Mandy Sevillana appeared on It's Showtime on ABS-CBN during the Mini-Me segment.
 Ataska Mercado appeared  in Star Circle Quest Season 4 on the third week, but she got eliminated.
 Francis Lim is the grand champion of Pinoy Halo-Halo, a competition of It's Showtime.
 Precious Galvez is the younger sister of The Voice Teens Season 1  teen artist Alessandra Galvez. She also later appeared on Tawag ng Tanghalan Kids.
 Esang De Torres appeared on It's Showtime during the Mini-Me segment. She was also hailed as grand winner of I-Shine Talent Camp Season 3 in August 2014. She later appeared on the second season of Your Face Sounds Familiar Kids and finished in third place.
 Luke Alford later appeared on the children's television show Team Yey!, as one of the six original hosts. He also appeared on Pinoy Big Brother: Kumunity Season 10 as  one of the teen housemates, together with Stephanie Jordan. Luke was evicted on Day 197, while Stephanie became one of the Biga-10 housemates and was evicted on Day 225.
 Narcylyn Esguerra later appeared on Pinoy Big Brother: Otso as one of the third batch and was evicted on Day 29.
 Nikki Apolinar later appeared on the second season of The Clash under the screen name, Nicole Apolinar but was eliminated in the second round.
 Aihna Imperial, Paul Abellana, Alain Diego Arroyo, Jonalyn Pepito and Jhoas Sumatra later appeared on Tawag ng Tanghalan Kids and Tawag ng Tanghalan. Jhoas became a weekly finalist in the fifth season while Diego and Jonalyn won as daily winners in the sixth season.
 Benedict Inciong later appeared on the first season of Sing Galing, under the screen name, Kit Inciong and became one of the Top 6 grand finalists.
 Jiah Austria later appeared on the second season of Born to Be a Star.
 Reynan Dal-anay later appeared on the sixth season of Tawag ng Tanghalan.
 Sassa Dagdag later appeared on the second season of The Clash, as one of the Top 12 contenders and finished in ninth place.
 Rock Opong and Kate Campo later appeared on Tawag ng Tanghalan Kids, as Ultimate Resbakers. They also appeared on second season of The Voice Teens. Rock joined Team Bamboo and finished in third place on Kamp Kawayan. He became the third consecutive comeback artist to advance to the Finals and eventually finished in third place after Justin Alva and Cyd Pangca from the third and fourth seasons of The Voice Kids respectively.  He also appeared on the Philippine franchise of Little Big Shots and on the third season of Asia's Got Talent but he was eliminated in the semifinals. Kate initially joined Team Sarah but she was stolen back to Team Bamboo in the battles and she placed as runner up to Heart Salvador who eventually won as the grand champion on Kamp Kawayan. She became the first stolen artist to advance to the Finals of The Voice Teens and the entire Philippine franchise of The Voice. She also appeared on Lola's Playlist on Eat Bulaga!.
 Zephanie Dimaranan later appeared on the second season of Tawag ng Tanghalan. She won as daily winner but she lost to Janine Berdin who eventually won as the grand champion of the season on her first attempt and later became a 3-time defending champion on her second attempt. She also appeared and eventually won as the grand champion on the first season of Idol Philippines.
 Elha Nympha later appeared on the first season of Your Face Sounds Familiar Kids and placed as runner up to Awra Briguela who eventually won as the grand champion of the season. She also appeared on the Philippine, American and French franchises of Little Big Shots respectively.

Reception

Television ratings
Television ratings for the second season of The Voice of the Philippines on ABS-CBN were gathered from two major sources, namely from AGB Nielsen and Kantar Media. AGB Nielsen's survey ratings were gathered from Mega Manila households, while Kantar Media's survey ratings were gathered from urban and rural households all over the Philippines.

References

External links
 The Voice Kids (season 2) on ABS-CBN

The Voice of the Philippines
The Voice Kids (Philippine TV series)
2015 Philippine television seasons